Géraldine Zivic (born December 7, 1975 in Buenos Aires, Argentina)  is an Argentine-born Colombian award-winning actress, model and television host  of Serbian descent best known for her roles in telenovelas.

Biography
At 15 years old, she moved to Colombia and still lives there today.
Her mother is Argentine, her father is Serbian who with his family moved to Argentina in 1943.
She played a part of the kind-hearted and sweet Christina in Telemundo's El Clon, unlike her portrayal of Monica in the previous Telemundo teen series, Niños Ricos, Pobres Padres where her character was a Villain. Her latest appearance was in Telemundo's Flor Salvaje where she played La Mina, an Argentinian prostitute.

Telenovela
 Quien mato a Patricia Soler ...Patricia Soler (2015)
 Flor Salvaje ....Mina (2011)
 El Clon ....Cristina Miranda (2010)
 Niños Ricos, Pobres Padres ....Mónica San Miguel (2009)
 El último matrimonio feliz .... Catalina (2008–2009)
 Aquí no hay quien viva ....Bea (2008–2009)
 Una anomalía perfecta- Karen (2008)
 Sin retorno(La deuda)- Laura (2007)
 Sin retorno- Patricia (2007)
 Tiempo Final- Florencia (2007)
 Mujeres Asesinas- Nelly (2007)
 Mujeres Asesinas- Ana María (2007)
 Amas de Casa Desesperadas- Lina Yepes (2006–2007)
 Los Reyes- Natalia- Protagónico (2005)
 La Costeña y El Cachaco- María Elvira (2003)
 La Lectora- Jazmín (2003)
 Punto de Giro- Brenda (2003)
 Pasiones Secretas- Teresa (2003)
 La sombrea del Arco Iris- Isabel (1999)
 La Mujer en el espejo- Mariana (1997)
 Otra en mi- Liliana Castillo / Valentina Uribe Mondragon (1996)
 Leche- Deboradora (1996)
 Eternamente Manuela- Laura (1995)
 Montaña Rusa (TV series)- Yamile (1994)

Movie

 Ilona Llega Con La Lluvia  Reparto - Dirigida por Sergio Cabrera

TV Host

 Presentadora Concurso ELITE MODELS 1998 Producido por Canal A
 Panorama 1995 Producido por JES
 Gente Corrida 1994 Productor Hernán Orjuela

Model

 Oscar De La Renta
 Silvia Tcherassi
 Pinel
 Touche
 Leonisa
 Postobón
 Jabón Carey
 Samsung
 Productos Familia
 Kia Automóviles

Awards

 Nominación al premio MEDIA ESPAÑA: Mejor Actriz protagonista. Otra en mí. 1997
 Premio  TV y Novelas, como protagonista  por Otra en mí. 1998
 Nominada PREMIOS ACPE como mejor actriz protagonista Otra en mí. 1998
 Nominada PREMIO SIMÓN BOLÍVAR como mejor actriz protagonista Otra en mí. 1999
 Premio Mara de Oro de Venezuela, como Mejor Actriz Antagónica por: La costeña y el cachaco. 2004
 Jurado de los Emmy Awards 2009 en la categoría de mejor actriz
 Nominada para los premios en Telemundo como mejor Antagónica-Villana en Niños Ricos Pobres Padres con el papel de Mónica San Miguel (2009)

References

Colombian telenovela actresses
Colombian television actresses
Argentine telenovela actresses
Argentine television actresses
1975 births
Living people
Argentine people of Serbian descent
Colombian people of Serbian descent
Colombian people of Argentine descent
Argentine emigrants to Colombia
Actresses from Buenos Aires
Naturalized citizens of Colombia
Colombian Scientologists
Argentine Scientologists